Chorwon can refer to several places in Korea.  Before the Korean War there was a single Chorwon County, which was subsequently divided and reorganized.  The different spellings are the result of different Romanizations, and the Korean names are identical.

 Cheorwon County, Gangwon Province, South Korea.
 Chorwon County, Kangwon Province, North Korea, formerly known as Anhyŏp.
 Chorwon is a horse that won the Louisville Handicap from 1997 to 1999.